Rohdea is a genus of plants native to eastern Asia (China, Japan, the Himalayas and Indochina). It was long thought to contain only a single species, R. japonica, but recent studies have resulted in several other taxa being transferred into the genus.

In the APG III classification system, it is placed in the family Asparagaceae, subfamily Nolinoideae (formerly the family Ruscaceae). It has also been placed in the former family Convallariaceae.

Although sometimes misspelled as Rhodea, the genus was actually named after Michael Rohde (1782-1812), a botanist from Bremen.

Species
Accepted species

Rohdea chinensis (Baker) N.Tanaka - Anhui, Fujian, Guangdong, Guangxi, Henan, Hubei, Hunan, Jiangxi, Shaanxi, Sichuan, Taiwan, Yunnan
Rohdea chlorantha (Baill.) N.Tanaka - Sichuan
Rohdea delavayi (Franch.) N.Tanaka - Tibet, Guangxi, Guizhou, Hubei, Hunan, Sichuan, Yunnan
Rohdea emeiensis (Z.Y.Zhu) N.Tanaka - Sichuan
Rohdea ensifolia (F.T.Wang & Tang) N.Tanaka - Yunnan
Rohdea eucomoides (Baker) N.Tanaka - Assam, Bhutan, Myanmar
Rohdea japonica (Thunb.) Roth - Japan, Korea, Guangxi, Guizhou, Hubei, Hunan, Jiangsu, Jiangxi, Shandong, Sichuan, Zhejiang 
Rohdea jinshanensis (Z.L.Yang & X.G.Luo) N.Tanaka - Sichuan
Rohdea lichuanensis (Y.K.Yang, J.K.Wu & D.T.Peng) Yamashita & M.N.Tamura - Hubei
Rohdea longipedunculata (F.T.Wang & S.Yun Liang) N.Tanaka - Yunnan
Rohdea nepalensis (Raf.) N.Tanaka - Tibet, Nepal, Bhutan, Assam, Myanmar, Sichuan, Yunnan
Rohdea pachynema (F.T.Wang & Tang) N.Tanaka - Sichuan, Yunnan
Rohdea siamensis (Yamashita & M.N.Tamura) Yamashita & M.N.Tamura - Laos, Thailand
Rohdea tonkinensis (Baill.) N.Tanaka - Vietnam, Yunnan, Guangdong
Rohdea urotepala Hand.-Mazz. - Sichuan, Yunnan
Rohdea verruculosa (Q.H.Chen) N.Tanaka - Yunnan, Guizhou
Rohdea wattii (C.B.Clarke) Yamashita & M.N.Tamura - Vietnam, Assam, Bhutan, Guangdong, Guangxi, Guizhou, Sichuan, Yunnan

References

Asparagaceae genera
Nolinoideae